Liang Chen and Wang Yafan were the defending champions, but were eliminated in the round-robin competition.

İpek Soylu and Xu Yifan won the title, defeating Yang Zhaoxuan and You Xiaodi in the final, 6–4, 3–6, [10–7].

Players

Draw

Final

Lotus group

Orchid group

References

Doubles Draw

WTA Elite Trophy
WTA Elite Trophy
2016 in Chinese tennis